Village Historic District is a registered historic district in Wyoming, Ohio, listed in the National Register of Historic Places on August 25, 1986.  It contains 277 contributing buildings.

Historic uses 
Single Dwelling

Notes

External links
A Self-Guided Walk Through Wyoming's Historic District. Retrieved August 11, 2015

National Register of Historic Places in Hamilton County, Ohio
Historic districts on the National Register of Historic Places in Ohio
Wyoming, Ohio
Historic districts in Hamilton County, Ohio